Moussa Diaby (born 7 July 1999) is a French professional footballer who plays as a winger for Bundesliga club Bayer Leverkusen and the France national team.

Club career

Paris Saint-Germain
Diaby is a product of the Paris Saint-Germain Youth Academy. He joined the club when he was 13 and began playing for the B team in 2017. Diaby was the recipient of the 2016 Titi d’Or as the most promising and best talent in the Paris Saint-Germain academy.

Loan to Crotone
Diaby was loaned to F.C. Crotone for the second-half of the 2017–18 Serie A season. He made his professional debut on 14 April 2018 in a Serie A match against Genoa. He replaced Marcello Trotta after 84 minutes in a 1–0 away loss. He would make one further first team appearance for Crotone in their 1–1 draw against eventual champions Juventus on 18 April.

Return to PSG
On 14 September 2018, Diaby, who replaced Lassana Diarra at halftime, scored for PSG in the 86th minute in a 4–0 win over AS Saint-Étienne. Diaby became the 124th academy graduate to feature for the senior side.

He went on to make 25 Ligue 1 appearances in 2018–19, scoring four times across all competitions and averaging an assist every 190 minutes during the club's successful title defence.

Bayer Leverkusen
On 14 June 2019, it was announced that Diaby would join Bayer Leverkusen on a five-year deal. Diaby scored his first Bundesliga goal for Leverkusen in his first competitive start on 23 November 2019 in the club's 1–1 draw with SC Freiburg.

Diaby scored Leverkusen's third goal in stoppage time to seal a win over 1. FC Union Berlin in the quarter-finals of the DFB-Pokal on 4 March 2020. In the next round, on 9 June 2020, Diaby scored the first goal in Leverkusen's 3–0 victory over fourth division 1. FC Saarbrücken to secure a spot in the 2020 DFB-Pokal Final. On 21 August 2021, he scored in the Bundesliga against Borussia Monchengladbach and it was his first goal of the season.

International career
Diaby is a France youth international having represented the country at U18, U19, U20, and U21 levels.

He produced a goal and three assists at the 2018 UEFA European U19 Championship, earning a place in the team of the tournament. The following summer, he scored one goal and assisted two more in four matches at the 2019 FIFA U20 World Cup where France were eliminated at the Round of 16 stage.

On 26 August 2021, he received his first call to France senior squad. He made his international debut on 1 September 2021 in the 2022 FIFA World Cup qualification match against Bosnia and Herzegovina, replacing Kylian Mbappé in the last minute of the match.

Personal life
Diaby was born in France and is of Malian descent.

Career statistics

Club

International

Honours
Paris Saint-Germain
 Ligue 1: 2018–19
 Trophée des Champions: 2018

France
 UEFA Nations League: 2020–21

Individual
 Titi d'Or: 2016
 UEFA European Under-19 Championship Team of the Tournament: 2018

References

External links

France profile at FFF
PSG profile

1999 births
Living people
Footballers from Paris
French footballers
France youth international footballers
France under-21 international footballers
France international footballers
Association football wingers
Paris Saint-Germain F.C. players
F.C. Crotone players
Bayer 04 Leverkusen players
Ligue 1 players
Serie A players
Bundesliga players
French expatriate footballers
Expatriate footballers in Germany
Expatriate footballers in Italy
French expatriate sportspeople in Germany
French expatriate sportspeople in Italy
Black French sportspeople
French sportspeople of Malian descent
UEFA Nations League-winning players